László Ipacs (born 13 January 1946) is a Hungarian judoka. He competed at the 1972 Summer Olympics and the 1976 Summer Olympics.

References

External links
 

1946 births
Living people
Hungarian male judoka
Olympic judoka of Hungary
Judoka at the 1972 Summer Olympics
Judoka at the 1976 Summer Olympics
People from Battonya
Sportspeople from Békés County